The 1986–87 Austin Peay Governors basketball team represented Austin Peay State University during the 1986–87 season. The Governors, led by 8th-year head coach Lake Kelly, played their home games at the Dunn Center in Clarksville, Tennessee as members of the Ohio Valley Conference.

After finishing fourth in the OVC regular season standings, Austin Peay won the OVC tournament to earn an automatic bid to the NCAA tournament. In the opening round, the Governors upset No. 3 seed Illinois, 68–67. It was the third upset of a No. 3 seed in the opening round by a No. 14 seed since the NCAA Tournament expanded to a 64-team field in 1985. Austin Peay followed the win with another strong showing, but they fell to No. 6 seed and eventual Final Four participant Providence, 90–87 in OT. The team finished with a 20–12 record (8–6 OVC).

Roster

Schedule and results

|-
!colspan=9 style=| Regular season

|-
!colspan=9 style=| Ohio Valley tournament

|-
!colspan=9 style=| NCAA tournament

Sources

References 

Austin Peay Governors men's basketball seasons
Austin Peay
Austin Peay
Austin Peay
Austin Peay